The 2013 NCAA Division I Men's Golf Championship was a golf tournament contested from May 28 to June 2 at the Crabapple Course of the Capital City Club in Atlanta, Georgia. It was the 75th NCAA Division I Men's Golf Championship, and the tournament was hosted by the Georgia Institute of Technology. The tournament was won by the Alabama Crimson Tide who won their first championship by defeating the Illinois Fighting Illini in the match-play championship round. The individual national championship was won by Max Homa of the California Golden Bears who won by three strokes.

The seedings for the regional tournaments were released on May 6, 2013, and the regional rounds were held around the country from May 16 to May 18, 2013.

Regional qualifying tournaments
The five teams with the lowest team scores qualified from each of the six regional tournaments for both the team and individual national championships in Atlanta.
The lowest scoring individual not affiliated with one of the qualified teams in their regional also qualified for the individual national championship in Atlanta.

Venue

This will be the first NCAA Division I Men's Golf Championship held at the Capital City Club in Atlanta, Georgia.

Team competition

Leaderboard
Par, single-round: 280
Par, total: 840

Source:

Note: Texas A&M (+1) eliminated in playoff for last three spots in match play, Arizona State (E), New Mexico (E), and UNLV (E) advanced.
Remaining teams: Florida State (845), Oklahoma (845), Auburn (846), Oklahoma State (847), Texas Tech (847), UCF (848), Washington (848), North Florida (849), Georgia (850), TCU (850), Tennessee (850), Coastal Carolina (851), LSU (854), Southern California (854), Florida (857), UCLA (858), Kent State (868), South Carolina (868),  Saint Mary's (869), Ball State (872)

Match play bracket
The eight teams with the lowest total scores after the first three rounds of play will advance to the match play bracket.

Source:

Individual competition
Par, single-round: 70
Par, total: 210

Source:

References

NCAA Men's Golf Championship
Golf in Georgia (U.S. state)
NCAA Division I Men's Golf Championship
NCAA Division I Men's Golf Championship
NCAA Division I Men's Golf Championship
NCAA Division I Men's Golf Championship
NCAA Division I Men's Golf Championship